"Love Me Better" is a song by British singer-songwriter James Blunt. It was released on 27 January 2017 as the lead single from his fifth studio album The Afterlove (2017). The song was written by Blunt, Ryan Tedder and Zach Skelton.

Music video
An accompanying music video directed by Vaughan Arnell was released onto YouTube on 2 February 2017 at a total length of three minutes and forty-nine seconds.

Live performances
Blunt performed the song on The Graham Norton Show on 24 February 2017.

Track listing

Charts

Release history

References

2017 songs
2017 singles
James Blunt songs
Songs written by James Blunt
Songs written by Ryan Tedder
Atlantic Records singles
Songs written by Zach Skelton
Music videos directed by Vaughan Arnell